Open Fire, Two Guitars is an album by American pop singer Johnny Mathis that was released on January 5, 1959, by Columbia Records on which he opts for guitar and bass accompaniment instead of performing alongside an orchestra. Two new songs ("An Open Fire" and "I'm Just a Boy in Love") are mixed in with covers of popular standards.

The album made its first appearance on Billboard magazine's list of the 25 Best-Selling Pop LPs in the US in the issue dated February 9, 1959, and got as high as  number four during its 96 weeks there. It received Gold certification from the Recording Industry Association of America for sales of 500,000 copies in the US on December 4, 1962.

The album was released for the first time on compact disc on June 28, 1994, as part of the Master Sound series in which Sony Music used the Super Bit Mapping process to remaster certain titles and burn them onto discs with 24-karat gold plating. It was also issued on a standard compact disc on December 23, 1999.

Reception
The album's production values were one thing that especially impressed Greg Adams of Allmusic. "Producer Mitch Miller is often associated with gimmicky or novelty productions, but his work on Open Fire, Two Guitars is perfectly understated, emphasizing the gentle caress of Mathis's voice over the relaxed counterpoint of the two guitars."  He added, "The album's effect seems nearly a cappella at times, but 'In the Still of the Night' finds Mathis intoning the lyrics over gently rhythmic guitar figures that educe new harmonic complexities from a well-known song." Writing decades after the album's initial release, Adams noted, "The enduring popularity of Open Fire, Two Guitars is attributable in part to its hypnotic aura of closeness and confidentiality, but also to the simple instrumentation that appeals to many rock-era listeners' preference for guitars over orchestral arrangements."

Upon its debut, Billboard gave it a positive review as well, writing, "It's a fine, warm collection of standards with the artist in best form."

Track listing

Side one
"An Open Fire" (Jerry Leiber, Mike Stoller) – 3:52
"Bye Bye Blackbird" (Mort Dixon, Ray Henderson) – 4:07
"In the Still of the Night" from Rosalie (Cole Porter) – 2:35
"Embraceable You" from Girl Crazy (George Gershwin, Ira Gershwin) – 3:28
"I'll Be Seeing You" from Right This Way (Irving Kahal, Sammy Fain) – 4:26
"Tenderly" (Jack Lawrence, Walter Gross) – 2:58

Side two
"When I Fall in Love" (Edward Heyman, Victor Young) – 4:31
"I Concentrate on You" from Broadway Melody of 1940 (Cole Porter) – 3:16
"Please Be Kind" (Sammy Cahn, Saul Chaplin) – 3:24
"You'll Never Know" from Hello, Frisco, Hello (Mack Gordon, Harry Warren) – 4:07
"I'm Just a Boy in Love" (Shirley Cowell) – 2:44
"My Funny Valentine" from Babes in Arms (Richard Rodgers, Lorenz Hart) – 3:37

Recording dates
From the liner notes for The Voice of Romance: The Columbia Original Album Collection:
October 2, 1958 — "I'm Just a Boy in Love", "In the Still of the Night", "My Funny Valentine"
October 3, 1958 — "Bye Bye Blackbird", "Embraceable You", "I Concentrate on You", "I'll Be Seeing You", "An Open Fire", "Please Be Kind", "Tenderly", "When I Fall in Love", "You'll Never Know"

Personnel

Original album
Johnny Mathis – vocals
Mitch Miller – producer
Al Caiola – guitar
Frank Carroll – bass 
Milt Hinton – bass 
Tony Mottola – guitar 
Dirone – photography

1999 CD reissue
From the liner notes for the CD:

Didier C. Deutsch – producer
Kevin Boutote – mixing and digital mastering
Joy Gilbert – project director
Darren Salmieri – A&R coordinator
Steve Berkowitz – A&R
Howard Fritzson – art direction 
Randall Martin – design
Don Huntstein – photography
Bob Cato – photography
Hank Parker – photography
Michael Cimicata – packaging manager

References

Bibliography

1959 albums
Jazz albums by American artists
Johnny Mathis albums
Columbia Records albums
Albums produced by Mitch Miller
Albums recorded at CBS 30th Street Studio